The U.S. 23 Country Music Highway Museum is a museum in Paintsville, Kentucky dedicated to the country music entertainers who were born or lived near U.S. Route 23 in eastern Kentucky. Entertainers exhibited within the museum include Billy Ray Cyrus, The Judds, Tom T. Hall, Ricky Skaggs, Hylo Brown, Loretta Lynn, Rebecca Lynn Howard, Keith Whitley, Dwight Yoakam, Patty Loveless, Tyler Childers, Sundy Best, and Gary Stewart. It also has a gift shop and a large conference room that can be reserved for events such as concerts.

See also 
 List of music museums

References

External links

Country Music Highway National Scenic Byway

Museums in Johnson County, Kentucky
American country music
Music museums in Kentucky
Biographical museums in Kentucky
Museums established in 2005
Buildings and structures completed in 2005
2005 establishments in Kentucky
Country music museums
Paintsville, Kentucky